Mohammad Irfan (born 1 August 1989) is a Pakistani first-class cricketer who plays for FATA Cheetas. In April 2018, he was named in Baluchistan's squad for the 2018 Pakistan Cup.

References

External links
 

Living people
Pakistani cricketers
Multan Sultans cricketers
1989 births